Tower Hill is a village in Shelby County, Illinois, United States. The population was 611 at the 2010 census.

Geography
Tower Hill is located at  (39.386302, -88.959717).

Demographics

As of the census of 2000, there were 609 people, 232 households, and 170 families residing in the village. The racial makeup of the village was 98.52% White, 0.33% Native American, and 1.15% from two or more races. Hispanic or Latino of any race were 0.33% of the population.

There were 232 households, out of which 32.3% had children under the age of 18 living with them, 56.5% were married couples living together, 10.8% had a female householder with no husband present, and 26.3% were non-families. 22.8% of all households were made up of individuals, and 12.9% had someone living alone who was 65 years of age or older. The average household size was 2.63 and the average family size was 3.03.

In the village, the population was spread out, with 28.2% under the age of 18, 8.4% from 18 to 24, 29.6% from 25 to 44, 19.4% from 45 to 64, and 14.4% who were 65 years of age or older. The median age was 34 years. For every 100 females, there were 89.7 males. For every 100 females age 18 and over, there were 96.8 males.

The median income for a household in the village was $30,909, and the median income for a family was $35,500. Males had a median income of $26,136 versus $20,625 for females. The per capita income for the village was $14,208. About 13.1% of families and 16.7% of the population were below the poverty line, including 21.9% of those under age 18 and 14.8% of those age 65 or over.

References

Villages in Shelby County, Illinois
Villages in Illinois